Diplodactylus fulleri, sometimes called the Lake Disappointment ground gecko, is a species of gecko, a lizard in the family Diplodactylidae. The species is endemic to Australia.

Etymology
The specific name, fulleri, is in honor of Australian ornithologist Phillip John Fuller.

Geographic range
D. fulleri is found in Western Australia in the vicinity of Kumpupintil Lake (formerly Lake Disappointment). The type locality given by Storr is "5 km W of the mouth of Savoury Creek".

References

Further reading
Cogger HG (2014). Reptiles and Amphibians of Australia, Seventh Edition. Clayton, Victoria, Australia: CSIRO Publishing. xxx + 1,033 pp. .
Storr GM (1978). "Seven new gekkonid lizards from Western Australia". Records of the Western Australian Museum 6 (3): 337–352. (Diplodactylus fulleri, new species, pp. 345–346, Plate 4).

Diplodactylus
Reptiles described in 1978
Taxa named by Glen Milton Storr
Geckos of Australia